Miikka Männikkö (born March 27, 1979) is a Finnish professional ice hockey forward who currently plays for Tappara of the SM-liiga.

Career statistics

References

External links

1979 births
Living people
Finnish sportspeople
Finnish ice hockey right wingers
Espoo Blues players
Graz 99ers players
HPK players
Ice hockey people from Tampere
Ilves players
JYP Jyväskylä players
KOOVEE players
Lahti Pelicans players
Lempäälän Kisa players
Mikkelin Jukurit players
Nyköpings Hockey players
Tappara players
Vaasan Sport players
Växjö Lakers players